State Route 71 (SR 71) is a  state highway in Jackson County in the northeastern corner of the U.S. state of Alabama. The southern terminus of the highway is at an intersection with SR 35 near Section. The highway continues until it reaches the Georgia state line, whereupon it continues as Georgia State Route 136 (SR 136).

Route description
SR 71 begins at the point where SR 35 completes its climb up Sand Mountain. As the highway heads northeast from Section, it travels along a two-lane roadway that heads through rural areas of farms and woods in Jackson County. The highway travels through the town of Dutton and continues through more rural areas, reaching an intersection with SR 40 west of Henagar. Past this intersection, SR 71 begins its ascent into the foothills of Lookout Mountain, passing more farmland and woodland with occasional homes. The highway continues through the community of Rosalie. From there, the roadway has numerous curves as it travels through Flat Rock, where it crosses SR 117. SR 71 continues winding northeast through more rural areas as it reaches the community of Higdon. A short distance past Higdon, the highway intersects the southern terminus of SR 73 and makes a turn to the east. SR 71 continues east to the Georgia state line, where it continues as Georgia State Route 136.

Major intersections

See also

References

071
Transportation in Jackson County, Alabama